Furuhjelm is the surname of a Swedish and Finnish noble family from Stockholm. The earliest reference dates back to 16th century, with merchant Olof Naucler being the oldest of known ancestors. The family is thought to be of German origin. The surname Furuhjelm originated in 1776. The coat of arms was registered at Finland's Riddarhus (House of Nobility) in 1818.

Notable members
Johan Hampus Furuhjelm (1821–1909), Russian vice-admiral, explorer, President of Russian-American Company, Governor of Taganrog in 1874–1876, Governor of Russian America, 1859–1863
 (1813–1892), Hero of the Crimean War during the siege of Bomarsund fortress, awarded with an Order of the White Eagle in 1879
Otto Wilhelm Furuhjelm (1819–1883), Russian lieutenant-general of Finnish descent
, governor of Oulu (province) in 1901–1903
Annie Furuhjelm (1859–1937), one of the foremost figures within the international women's movement and a member of Finland's Parliament.
Ragnar Furuhjelm (1879–1944), a Finnish astronomer and politician

See also
List of Swedish noble families
List of Finnish noble families

References

External links
Peerage of the Furuhjelms at Sweden's House of Nobility 
Peerage of the Furuhjelms at Finland's House of Nobility  

Swedish noble families
Finnish families of German ancestry
Finnish families of Swedish ancestry
Finnish noble families